Gustavo Eduardo Viveros Le-Borgne (born 1 December 1947), nicknamed El Flaco, is a Chilean former footballer and coach who played as a midfielder.

Career
He was international with the Chile national team between 1971 and 1973. He played 10 games for the national team, scoring two goals against Argentina and Peru.

Personal life
He is the uncle of fellow professional footballers Ricardo Viveros and Juan Francisco Viveros.

Honours

Club
Unión Española
 Chilean Primera División: 1973

Deportes Concepción
 Segunda División de Chile: 1967

References

External links
 

1947 births
Living people
Sportspeople from Concepción, Chile
Chilean footballers
Chile international footballers
Deportes Concepción (Chile) footballers
Unión Española footballers
Rangers de Talca footballers
Deportes Magallanes footballers
Magallanes footballers
Primera B de Chile players
Chilean Primera División players
Association football midfielders